"Slowly, Slowly" is a 1994 single by Magnapop from the album Hot Boxing, released by Play It Again Sam Records on CD (catalogue number 450.0257.22 - BIAS 257 CD) and 12" gramophone record (450.0257.30 - BIAS 257), as well as a limited-edition white vinyl version (450.0257.38 - BIAS 257 X.) A promo CD edition was released by Priority Records as DPRO 50804. A recording of the song is also featured on the live album Magnapop Live at Maxwell's 03/09/2005. A music video was created for the song in 1994 and it was featured on the 1995 soundtrack to the film Mad Love.

Track listing
All songs written by Linda Hopper and Ruthie Morris, except where noted
"Slowly, Slowly" – 3:35
"Song #1" (Ian MacKaye) – 2:21
"Here It Comes" (Niceley Version) – 2:40
"Puff" – 3:16

Personnel
Magnapop
Linda Hopper – lead vocals
David McNair – drums
Ruthie Morris – lead guitar
Shannon Mulvaney – bass guitar

Technical staff
David Collins – remastering at A&M Studios
Valerie Raimonde – design
Ruth Leitman – art direction, photography
Bob Mould – production on "Slowly, Slowly"
Ted Niceley – production on "Song #1", "Here It Comes" (Niceley Version), and "Puff"
Jim Wilson – engineering

Sales chart performance
The single spent seven weeks on the charts, peaking on September 10, 1994, at 25.

References

External links

"Slowly, Slowly" at Discogs

1994 songs
1994 singles
Magnapop songs
PIAS Recordings singles
Song recordings produced by Bob Mould
Songs written by Ruthie Morris
Songs written by Linda Hopper